The Rieger Hotel in Kansas City, Missouri is a building erected in 1915. It was listed on the National Register of Historic Places in 2004.

One of the most recognizable buildings in Kansas City's Crossroads Art District. On the northwest corner of 20th and Main Street, the Rieger Hotel was built by local entrepreneur Alexander Rieger.  The hotel was originally utilized for traveling businessmen, but was also known to host Al Capone when he would stay in Kansas City due to the building's close proximity to Kansas City's Union Station which made for quick escapes.

Today, the original lobby plays host to the award-winning restaurant, The Rieger Hotel Grill & Exchange.  The restaurant pays homage to the building's rich history as well as the J. Rieger & Company pre-prohibition liquor brand.  The basement is utilized by a speakeasy styled bar, Manifesto.

While the hotel was sold by the Rieger family in 1926, it has maintained the name and historical value throughout the years.  In 2003, the upper floors of the building were converted into condominiums.

References

 http://www.theriegerkc.com/
 http://riegerhotel.com/
 Family resources, photo albums, and a collection of old newspaper articles

External links

Hotels in Kansas City, Missouri
Hotel buildings on the National Register of Historic Places in Missouri
National Register of Historic Places in Kansas City, Missouri